Nandao is a kind of sword that is used mostly in contemporary Chinese wushu exercises and forms. It is the southern variation of the "northern broadsword", or Beidao. Its blade bears some resemblance to the butterfly sword, also a southern Chinese single-bladed weapon; the main difference is the size, and the fact that the butterfly swords have D-shaped knuckle guards. The main difference with the beidao is that the nandao is mostly used two-handed due to its larger amount of weight, and it has a large metal crossguard useful in deflecting blows and hooking the opponent's weapon; also, although it is single-edged, the nandao is not curved like the northern broadsword.

The differentiation between beidao and nandao appear to be rather modern. There is no historical usage of the term and few antique weapons have been found with a shape that resembles a "nandao". Therefore, it can never have been a major form as widely used as niuweidao, yanmaodao, liuyedao and the Butterfly swords. It needs momentum to be used effectively, you deflect rather than block because of this.

References

Chinese martial arts terminology
Chinese swords
Blade weapons

Events in wushu